Bearsden Academy is a non-denominational, state secondary school in Bearsden, East Dunbartonshire, Scotland.

History

Bearsden Cross site (1911–1958)
In 1911, the school was situated on the corner of Roman Road and Drymen Road north of Bearsden railway station in the Bearsden Cross area of the town. It was originally known as New Kilpatrick Higher Grade School. It comprised both a primary school and a secondary school. The building was designed by the architectural firm James M. Monro & Sons. It opened on 17 August 1911. The first headmaster was Hugh Primrose. In 1920, the school was renamed Bearsden Academy. In 1958, with the town expanding, and becoming a burgh, a new secondary school was built on Morven Road and Bearsden Academy was moved there and the whole of the remaining building became Bearsden Primary School.

Morven Road site (1958–2010)

From 1958 to 2010 the school was located on the south side of Morven Road in Bearsden. The old Morven Road site was redeveloped as a new housing estate, comprising detached and flatted dwellings known as Academy Grove in 2009–12. Norman McLeod was a rector at the school and one of the streets in Academy Grove is named in his honour.

Stockiemuir Road site (2010–)

St Peter's College
The Stockiemuir Road site the academy occupies was originally a Roman Catholic seminary for the Archdiocese of Glasgow and then a teaching college. In 1874, the Archbishop of Glasgow, Charles Eyre originally established St Peter's College in Partickhill. In 1892, he decided to move it to Bearsden. The college chapel was the first to serve the local Catholic population.

With the arrival of a railway to the area, the population increased and the college chapel was expanded. In 1946, a fire destroyed the college, razing it to the ground. The decision was made by the archdiocese to abandon the site and build a new seminary in Cardross. The seminary was moved to Darleith House in Cardross and then Kilmahew House, before the new purpose-built St Peter's Seminary in Cardross was ready in 1966.

Teaching College
In 1966, to replace the seminary, a teaching college was built on the site. It was designed by the same architects as St Peter's Seminary, Cardross, the firm of Gillespie, Kidd & Coia (GKC). It was built in a U-shape, with two teaching blocks, a physical education building and five student accommodation buildings. In 1969, the complex was opened, as the Notre Dame College of Education.

In 1981, it merged with Craiglockhart College and was renamed St Andrew's College of Education. On 4 March 1998, it was registered as a category A listed building. In 1999, it joined with University of Glasgow to become the Faculty of Education of the University of Glasgow. In 2002, the teaching college was relocated and the site was declared surplus to university requirements. After negotiations between Historic Scotland and East Dunbartonshire Council, it was decided to demolish the site and build a school.

The new building was built under a public-private partnership. In August 2010 the new site for Bearsden Academy opened to staff and students.

Controversies

32-year-old pupil
In September 1995, it was discovered that Brian MacKinnon, a 32-year-old former student, had attended the academy for a year on the pretext of being a Canadian teenager named Brandon Lee. He had shaved his eyebrows to look younger and permed his hair. He starred in a school production of South Pacific and gained six highers (including five A grades, taking English, Maths, Chemistry, Physics and Biology), before going on to study medicine at Dundee University. Teachers had remarked on his mature appearance.

A 2022 documentary film about the events, My Old School, was made by one of Mackinnon's fellow pupils. It contains interviews with students and staff from the time; Alan Cumming plays the adult MacKinnon, lip syncing to the audio of MacKinnon's interviews.

Sex offenders
In November 2011 a married father of two was sentenced to a year and two months in jail for sexual offences relating to two pupils at Bearsden Academy. 39-year-old Maths teacher Muir McCormick admitted a total of four sex charges involving the girls, aged 16 and 17. He had been suspended when the allegations first emerged, and later resigned.

In 2005 East Dunbartonshire Council launched an inquiry into an allegation that another teacher had an affair with a former pupil. The teacher, who was not named, was sent home from the school after the 17-year-old girl's father made an official complaint.

In 2007, a person training to be a teacher, while on placement at Bearsden Academy's music department, was convicted of 31 sexual offences committed against boys as young as twelve and sentenced to five years in jail. Andrew Oliver Kingsley committed them between 2006 and 2009 in Glasgow, Ayrshire, London and a Fife secondary school where he had his probationary year. None of these offences took place at Bearsden Academy.

School roll

Notable alumni

 Edwyn Collins of Orange Juice
 Katherine Grainger, Olympic Gold medallist rower
 Alex Kapranos of Franz Ferdinand
David Moyes, former manager of Manchester United
Ross Greer MSP, Scottish Green Party MSP for West Scotland

References

External links

 Bearsden Academy's home page
Bearsden Academy's page on Parentzone

Secondary schools in East Dunbartonshire
Educational institutions established in 1911
Bearsden
1911 establishments in Scotland